Mattia Bellucci (born 1 June 2001) is an Italian tennis player.

Bellucci has a career high ATP singles ranking of 153 achieved on 12 December 2022. He also has a career high doubles ranking of 407 achieved on 8 August 2022.

Career

2022
Bellucci won two ATP Challenger singles titles at the 2022 Saint-Tropez Open and at the 2022 Vilnius Open both in October 2022.

2023: Grand Slam debut
In January, Bellucci qualified for the 2023 Australian Open to make his Grand Slam debut.

ATP Challenger and ITF World Tennis Tour finals

Singles: 12 (8–3)

Doubles: 5 (4–1)
{|
|

References

External links
 
 

2001 births
Living people
People from Busto Arsizio
Italian male tennis players
21st-century Italian people
Sportspeople from the Province of Varese